Dominic Andrew Hendricks (born 7 November 1990) is a South African cricketer who played for Gauteng.  A left-handed batsman, Hendricks has also represented South Africa U19.
Hendricks made his List A debut for Gauteng on his 19th birthday, making a half century at quicker than a run a ball. His first appearance for South Africa U19 came just over a month later, as he opened the batting against Sri Lanka U19 in the South Africa Tri-Nation U-19 tournament.  He scored 66 of an opening partnership of 119 that helped set up a South African victory. South Africa took the same squad to the 2010 U-19 Cricket World Cup in New Zealand.  Hendricks scored a century and three fifties during the tournament to finish as the leading run-scorer in the competition. He was included in the Gauteng cricket team for the 2015 Africa T20 Cup.

He was included in several squads: in June 2018, he was named in the Highveld Lions squad for the 2018–19 season; in September 2019, he was included in the Gauteng squad for the 2019–20 CSA Provincial T20 Cup; and in April 2021, he was included in the Gauteng squad for the 2021–22 cricket season in South Africa.

References

External links
 

1990 births
Living people
South African cricketers
Gauteng cricketers
Wicket-keepers